Raymond "Ray" Cording (first ¼ 1933 – 2013) was an English professional rugby league footballer who played in the 1950s. He played at club level for Featherstone Rovers (Heritage No. 316), as an occasional goal-kicking , i.e. number 6.

Background
Raymond Cording's birth was registered in Pontefract, West Riding of Yorkshire, England, he worked as a fitter at Ackton Hall Colliery, and he died aged .

Club career
Raymond Cording made his début for Featherstone Rovers against Batley on Wednesday 30 August 1950, and he played his last match for Featherstone Rovers during 1955–56 season, he appears to have scored no drop-goals (or field-goals as they are currently known in Australasia), but prior to the 1974–75 season all goals, whether; conversions, penalties, or drop-goals, scored 2-points, consequently prior to this date drop-goals were often not explicitly documented, therefore '0' drop-goals may indicate drop-goals not recorded, rather than no drop-goals scored.

Challenge Cup Final appearances
Cording played  in Featherstone Rovers' 12–18 defeat by Workington Town in the 1951–52 Challenge Cup Final during the 1951–52 season at Wembley Stadium, London on Saturday 19 April 1952, in front of a crowd of 72,093.

References

External links
Search for "Cording" at rugbyleagueproject.org
Ray Evans at marklaspalmas.blogspot.com
February 2017 at marklaspalmas.blogspot.com
UPDATED: Death of former Featherstone Rovers star Cording
Search for "Raymond Cording" at britishnewspaperarchive.co.uk
Search for "Ray Cording" at britishnewspaperarchive.co.uk

1933 births
2013 deaths
English rugby league players
Featherstone Rovers players
Place of death missing
Rugby league five-eighths
Rugby league players from Pontefract
Rugby league wingers